Cameron Shields (born December 15, 2000) is an Australian racing driver. He currently competes in the Indy Pro 2000 Championship with DEForce Racing.

Racing Record

Career Summary 

*Season still in progress.

Complete WeatherTech SportsCar Championship results
(key) (Races in bold indicate pole position; results in italics indicate fastest lap)

References 

2000 births
Living people
Australian racing drivers
Formula Ford drivers
Australian Formula 3 Championship drivers
U.S. F2000 National Championship drivers
Indy Pro 2000 Championship drivers

WeatherTech SportsCar Championship drivers
Newman Wachs Racing drivers
Australian F4 Championship drivers